Northumberland is a ceremonial county and unitary authority area in North East England. 

Northumberland may also refer to:

Place names

Australia
Northumberland County, New South Wales
Cape Northumberland, a headland in South Australia

Canada
Northumberland County, Ontario
Northumberland County, New Brunswick
Northumberland Strait, adjacent to Prince Edward Island
Northumberland Sound, at the west end of Melville Island (Arctic)
Northumberland (Ontario electoral district), a former federal electoral district
Northumberland (Ontario provincial electoral district), a former provincial electoral district in Ontario
Northumberland (New Brunswick electoral district), a former federal electoral district
Northumberland (provincial electoral district), a former provincial electoral district in New Brunswick

England
Kingdom of Northumbria, a medieval Anglian kingdom in what is now Northern England and south-east Scotland
Northumberland National Park, Northumberland
Northumberland Park (disambiguation), for multiple places with that name
Northumberland Avenue, London
on the site of the former Northumberland House

United States
Northumberland County, Pennsylvania
Northumberland County, Virginia
Northumberland, New Hampshire
Northumberland, New York
Northumberland, Pennsylvania

Islands
Northumberland Island (Kiatak), in northwest Greenland
Northumberland Islands, an island chain off the coast of Queensland, Australia

People
Duke of Northumberland
Earl of Northumberland

Armed Forces
Northumberland Hussars
Royal Northumberland Fusiliers

Ships
HMS Northumberland, several ships of the Royal Navy
French ship Northumberland, several ships of the French Navy
Northumberland (ship), several ships

Sports
Northumberland County Cricket Club
Northumberland Football Association

Other uses
Northumberland Apartments, Washington, D.C.

See also

Northumbria (disambiguation)